Proof of authority (PoA) is an algorithm used with blockchains that delivers comparatively fast transactions through a consensus mechanism based on identity as a stake. The most notable platforms using PoA are VeChain, Bitgert, Palm Network and Xodex.

Proof-of-authority
In PoA-based networks, transactions and blocks are validated by approved accounts, known as validators. Validators run software allowing them to put transactions in blocks. The process is automated and does not require validators to be constantly monitoring their computers. It, however, does require maintaining the computer (the authority node) uncompromised. The term was coined by Gavin Wood, co-founder of Ethereum and Parity Technologies.

With PoA, individuals earn the right to become validators, so there is an incentive to retain the position that they have gained. By attaching a reputation to identity, validators are incentivized to uphold the transaction process, as they do not wish to have their identities attached to a negative reputation. This is considered more robust than PoS (proof-of-stake) - PoS, while a stake between two parties may be even, it does not take into account each party’s total holdings. This means that incentives can be unbalanced. 
On the other hand, PoA only allows non-consecutive block approval from any one validator, meaning that the risk of serious damage is centralized to the authority node.

PoA is suited for both private networks and public networks, like POA Network or Eurus, where trust is distributed.

References 

Algorithms
Blockchains